LRK could refer to:

 Little Rock (Amtrak station), Arkansas, US, Amtrak station code
 Long Range Kinematic
 LR(k), a type of LR parser in computing